Pence is an unincorporated community in Wolfe County, Kentucky, United States.

Notes

Unincorporated communities in Wolfe County, Kentucky
Unincorporated communities in Kentucky